The Chinese Ambassador to Laos is the official representative of the People's Republic of China to Laos.

List of representatives

See also
 China–Laos relations

References 

 
Laos
China